Bol Kong (born January 4, 1988) is a former South Sudanese-Canadian professional basketball player who played one year for the Ottawa SkyHawks of the National Basketball League of Canada (NBL).

Early life 
Kong was born on January 4, 1988, in Kassala, Sudan and moved with his family to Canada as a refugee at age 6. He later received Canadian dual citizenship.

College career
He played college basketball with four different schools within Canada and the United States: Douglas College, Gonzaga University, Northern Alberta Institute of Technology, and St. Francis Xavier University. At Douglas, he was a member of the 2007–08 Canadian Collegiate Athletic Association (CCAA) championship team and he was named to the All-Tournament team. Kong was also named All-Canadian at NAIT.

Professional career
Kong was drafted by the Mississauga Power with the fourth overall pick in the 2013 NBL Canada draft, but signed with the Ottawa SkyHawks on November 20, 2013, instead.

References

External links 
 Bol Kong at USBasket.com
 St. Francis Xavier profile
 Gonzaga bio
 Bol Kong at RealGM

1988 births
Living people
Forwards (basketball)
Canadian people of South Sudanese descent
Canadian sportspeople of African descent
Sportspeople of South Sudanese descent
Gonzaga Bulldogs men's basketball players
Northern Alberta Institute of Technology alumni
Ottawa SkyHawks players
St. Francis Xavier University alumni